The Mount Mabolasi is a mountain in Taiwan. The peak is located in Xinyi Township, Nantou County, near the border of Hualien County. It is also known as the Mount Wulameng.

Geology
It is the fourth highest mountain of Taiwan.

History
On 22 September 2015, an AIDC AT-3 of the Republic of China Air Force crashed around the mountain area during routine training flight, killing its two pilots.

On 20 January 2019, Taiwanese hiker, Gigi Wu, known for her social media photos of herself atop Taiwanese mountains wearing only two-piece bathing suits, fell into a 20-meter valley near Mabolasi Mountain. Rescue workers found her deceased.

See also
 100 Peaks of Taiwan
 List of mountains in Taiwan
 Yushan National Park

References

Mabolasi
Landforms of Nantou County